SE-Explorer is a freeware portable file manager for Windows which can be used as alternative to Windows Explorer. It is sharply different from FAR Manager and Norton Commander because it is GUI-based application with tabbed interface which made it possible to manipulate more than one directory or file view at the time and it has both types of file managers: orthodox two-panelled manager with two file windows side by side and native explorer emulator.

The application key features are:

 Clear tabbed interface
 Different file browsers: dual panel, classic windows explorer, command prompt
 Enhanced file search function and embedded size scanner
 Media player for audio and video files: MP3, WAV, AVI, MPEG, WMV, SWF, MOV, etc.
 Picture viewer which supports most popular image file formats
 Archive explorer for ZIP, RAR, ISO, 7z, MSI, CAB, etc.
 Resource view for executable files and icon libraries
 PDF, DjVu, DOC, WRI, Html Help and RTF document view
 Text viewer with syntax highlighting
 Folder comparison
 Text file compare (difference)
 Hex viewer for binary files
 Dll Inspector with resources/dependencies/objects views for executable files
 Web Browser for web and email files
 TrueType TTF font files view
 XML structure view

The application is written in .NET, so the Microsoft .NET Framework 2.0 is required.

Main executable file can be easily copied onto USB flash drive and used as a portable application.

Licensing
SE-Explorer is a freeware and requires no registration or activation. You can download and use it for your own needs for free.

History
The first version of SE-Explorer was uploaded to the site on 20 June 2008. At present the latest version is 1.31.1.610 which now has "Folder Comparison" feature.

See also
 SE-Explorer home page
 File managers
 Comparison of file managers

File managers for Microsoft Windows
Windows-only freeware
Year of introduction missing